Rowena Fry (October 22, 1892 – November 2, 1990) was an American painter.

Born in Athens, Alabama, Fry studied at the Watkins Institute in Nashville before coming to Chicago in the late 1920s. There she studied at the School of the Art Institute of Chicago and the Hubert Ropp School of Art. From 1938 to 1939 she was involved as a muralist with the Works Progress Administration, producing work at Abbott Laboratories, Oscar Meyer, and the American Marietta Paint Company. She taught painting and serigraphy from her studio for many years, and from 1942 to 1946 she taught art at the Great Lakes Naval Hospital.

For many years she shared an apartment with Natalie Smith Henry at the Lambert Tree Studios building, and Henry depicted her in the watercolor Rowena Washing Her Hair sometime during the 1930s. Fry went to Malvern, Arkansas to live with Henry later in life. She died there, survived by two sisters, and is buried in the town's Oak Ridge Cemetery; her grave marker gives a date of birth of October 27, 1900. Fry's work is in the collection of the Illinois State Museum. A collection of the two women's papers was digitized by the Archives of American Art at the Smithsonian Institution.

References

1892 births
1990 deaths
American women painters
20th-century American painters
20th-century American women artists
People from Athens, Alabama
Painters from Alabama
Artists from Chicago
Painters from Illinois
School of the Art Institute of Chicago alumni
Federal Art Project artists
Works Progress Administration in Illinois